Bossolasco is a comune (municipality) in the Province of Cuneo in the Italian region Piedmont, located about  southeast of Turin and about  northeast of Cuneo.

Main sights
Balestrino Castle
Del Carretto Castle (14th century)

References 

Cities and towns in Piedmont